In mathematics and computer algebra, automatic differentiation (auto-differentiation, autodiff, or AD), also called algorithmic differentiation, computational differentiation, is a set of techniques to evaluate the partial derivative of a function specified by a computer program. 

Automatic differentiation exploits the fact that every computer program, no matter how complicated, executes a sequence of elementary arithmetic operations (addition, subtraction, multiplication, division, etc.) and elementary functions (exp, log, sin, cos, etc.). By applying the chain rule repeatedly to these operations, partial derivatives of arbitrary order can be computed automatically, accurately to working precision, and using at most a small constant factor more arithmetic operations than the original program.

Difference from other differentiation methods 

Automatic differentiation is distinct from symbolic differentiation and numerical differentiation. 
Symbolic differentiation faces the difficulty of converting a computer program into a single mathematical expression and can lead to inefficient code. Numerical differentiation (the method of finite differences) can introduce round-off errors in the discretization process and cancellation. Both of these classical methods have problems with calculating higher derivatives, where complexity and errors increase. Finally, both of these classical methods are slow at computing partial derivatives of a function with respect to many inputs, as is needed for gradient-based optimization algorithms. Automatic differentiation solves all of these problems.

Forward and reverse accumulation

Chain rule of partial derivatives of composite functions 
Fundamental to automatic differentiation is the decomposition of differentials provided by the chain rule of partial derivatives of composite functions. For the simple composition

the chain rule gives

Two types of automatic differentiation 
Usually, two distinct modes of automatic differentiation are presented.
 forward accumulation (also called bottom-up, forward mode, or tangent mode)
 reverse accumulation (also called top-down, reverse mode, or adjoint mode)
Forward accumulation specifies that one traverses the chain rule from inside to outside (that is, first compute  and then  and at last ), while reverse accumulation has the traversal from outside to inside (first compute  and then  and at last ). More succinctly,

These two are used based on the sweep count. The computational complexity of one sweep is proportional to the complexity of the original code.
Backpropagation of errors in multilayer perceptrons, a technique used in machine learning, is a special case of reverse accumulation.

Forward accumulation was introduced by R.E. Wengert in 1964. According to Andreas Griewank, reverse accumulation has been suggested since the late 1960s, but the inventor is unknown. Seppo Linnainmaa published reverse accumulation in 1976.

Forward accumulation 
In forward accumulation AD, one first fixes the independent variable with respect to which differentiation is performed and computes the derivative of each sub-expression recursively. In a pen-and-paper calculation, this involves repeatedly substituting the derivative of the inner functions in the chain rule:

This can be generalized to multiple variables as a matrix product of Jacobians.

Compared to reverse accumulation, forward accumulation is natural and easy to implement as the flow of derivative information coincides with the order of evaluation. Each variable  is augmented with its derivative  (stored as a numerical value, not a symbolic expression),

as denoted by the dot. The derivatives are then computed in sync with the evaluation steps and combined with other derivatives via the chain rule.

Using the chain rule, if  has predecessors in the computational graph:

As an example, consider the function:

For clarity, the individual sub-expressions have been labeled with the variables .

With the seed values set, the values propagate using the chain rule as shown. Figure 2 shows a pictorial depiction of this process as a computational graph.
{| class="wikitable"
!Operations to compute value !!Operations to compute derivative
|-
| ||  (seed)
|-
| ||  (seed)
|-
| || 
|-
| || 
|-
| || 
|}

To compute the gradient of this example function, which requires not only  but also , an additional sweep is performed over the computational graph using the seed values .

Reverse accumulation 
In reverse accumulation AD, the dependent variable to be differentiated is fixed and the derivative is computed with respect to each sub-expression recursively. In a pen-and-paper calculation, the derivative of the outer functions is repeatedly substituted in the chain rule:

In reverse accumulation, the quantity of interest is the adjoint, denoted with a bar ; it is a derivative of a chosen dependent variable with respect to a subexpression :

Using the chain rule, if  has successors in the computational graph:

Reverse accumulation traverses the chain rule from outside to inside, or in the case of the computational graph in Figure 3, from top to bottom. The example function is scalar-valued, and thus there is only one seed for the derivative computation, and only one sweep of the computational graph is needed to calculate the (two-component) gradient. This is only half the work when compared to forward accumulation, but reverse accumulation requires the storage of the intermediate variables  as well as the instructions that produced them in a data structure known as a "tape" or a Wengert list (however, Wengert published forward accumulation, not reverse accumulation), which may consume significant memory if the computational graph is large. This can be mitigated to some extent by storing only a subset of the intermediate variables and then reconstructing the necessary work variables by repeating the evaluations, a technique known as rematerialization. Checkpointing is also used to save intermediary states.

The operations to compute the derivative using reverse accumulation are shown in the table below (note the reversed order):

The data flow graph of a computation can be manipulated to calculate the gradient of its original calculation. This is done by adding an adjoint node for each primal node, connected by adjoint edges which parallel the primal edges but flow in the opposite direction. The nodes in the adjoint graph represent multiplication by the derivatives of the functions calculated by the nodes in the primal. For instance, addition in the primal causes fanout in the adjoint; fanout in the primal causes addition in the adjoint; a unary function  in the primal causes  in the adjoint; etc.

Beyond forward and reverse accumulation 

Forward and reverse accumulation are just two (extreme) ways of traversing the chain rule. Central to this proof is the idea that algebraic dependencies may exist between the local partials that label the edges of the graph. In particular, two or more edge labels may be recognized as equal. The complexity of the problem is still open if it is assumed that all edge labels are unique and algebraically independent.

Automatic differentiation using dual numbers 

Forward mode automatic differentiation is accomplished by augmenting the algebra of real numbers and obtaining a new arithmetic. An additional component is added to every number to represent the derivative of a function at the number, and all arithmetic operators are extended for the augmented algebra. The augmented algebra is the algebra of dual numbers.

Replace every number  with the number , where  is a real number, but  is an abstract number with the property  (an infinitesimal; see Smooth infinitesimal analysis). Using only this, regular arithmetic gives

using .

Now, polynomials can be calculated in this augmented arithmetic. If , then

The new arithmetic consists of ordered pairs, elements written , with ordinary arithmetics on the first component, and first order differentiation arithmetic on the second component, as described above. Extending the above results on polynomials to analytic functions gives a list of the basic arithmetic and some standard functions for the new arithmetic:

and in general for the primitive function ,

The derivative of a function  at the point  is now found by calculating  using the above arithmetic, which gives  as the result.

Vector arguments and functions

Multivariate functions can be handled with the same efficiency and mechanisms as univariate functions by adopting a directional derivative operator. Note that in many optimization applications, the directional derivative is indeed sufficient.

High order and many variables

The above arithmetic can be generalized to calculate second order and higher derivatives of multivariate functions. However, the arithmetic rules quickly grow complicated: complexity is quadratic in the highest derivative degree. Instead, truncated Taylor polynomial algebra can be used. The resulting arithmetic, defined on generalized dual numbers, allows efficient computation using functions as if they were a data type. Once the Taylor polynomial of a function is known, the derivatives are easily extracted.

Implementation 

Forward-mode AD is implemented by a nonstandard interpretation of the program in which real numbers are replaced by dual numbers, constants are lifted to dual numbers with a zero epsilon coefficient, and the numeric primitives are lifted to operate on dual numbers. This nonstandard interpretation is generally implemented using one of two strategies: source code transformation or operator overloading.

Source code transformation (SCT) 

The source code for a function is replaced by an automatically generated source code that includes statements for calculating the derivatives interleaved with the original instructions.

Source code transformation can be implemented for all programming languages, and it is also easier for the compiler to do compile time optimizations. However, the implementation of the AD tool itself is more difficult and the build system is more complex.

Operator overloading (OO) 

Operator overloading is a possibility for source code written in a language supporting it. Objects for real numbers and elementary mathematical operations must be overloaded to cater for the augmented arithmetic depicted above. This requires no change in the form or sequence of operations in the original source code for the function to be differentiated, but often requires changes in basic data types for numbers and vectors to support overloading and often also involves the insertion of special flagging operations. Due to the inherent operator overloading overhead on each loop, this approach usually demonstrates weaker speed performance. 

Examples of operator-overloading implementations of automatic differentiation in C++ are the Adept, the NAG's dco library, and the Stan libraries.

Operator overloading and Source Code Transformation 

Overloaded Operators can be used to extract the valuation graph, followed by automatic generation of the AD-version of the primal function at run-time. Unlike the classic OO AAD, such AD-function does not change from one iteration to the next one. Hence there is any OO or tape interpretation run-time overhead per Xi sample.

With the AD-function being generated at runtime, it can be optimised to take into account the current state of the program and precompute certain values. In addition, it can be generated in a way to consistently utilize native CPU vectorization to process 4(8)-double chunks of user data (AVX2\AVX512 speed up x4-x8). With multithreading added into account, such approach can lead to a final acceleration of order 8 × #Cores compared to the traditional AAD tools. A reference implementation is available on GitHub.

See also
Differentiable programming

Notes

References

Further reading

External links
 www.autodiff.org, An "entry site to everything you want to know about automatic differentiation"
 Automatic Differentiation of Parallel OpenMP Programs
 Automatic Differentiation, C++ Templates and Photogrammetry
 Automatic Differentiation, Operator Overloading Approach
 Compute analytic derivatives of any Fortran77, Fortran95, or C program through a web-based interface Automatic Differentiation of Fortran programs
 Description and example code for forward Automatic Differentiation in Scala
 finmath-lib stochastic automatic differentiation, Automatic differentiation for random variables (Java implementation of the stochastic automatic differentiation).
 Adjoint Algorithmic Differentiation: Calibration and Implicit Function Theorem
 C++ Template-based automatic differentiation article and implementation
 Tangent Source-to-Source Debuggable Derivatives
 Exact First- and Second-Order Greeks by Algorithmic Differentiation
 Adjoint Algorithmic Differentiation of a GPU Accelerated Application
 Adjoint Methods in Computational Finance Software Tool Support for Algorithmic Differentiationop
 More than a Thousand Fold Speed Up for xVA Pricing Calculations with Intel Xeon Scalable Processors

Differential calculus
Computer algebra